Sega System - is a common name for Sega hardware products.

Digit-named series

Arcade system boards
Sega System 1
Sega System 2
Sega System 16
Sega System 18
Sega System 24
Sega System 32

Letter-named series

Arcade system boards
Sega System E
Sega System C
Sega System C2
Sega SystemSP

Word-named series

Game consoles
Sega Master System

See also
KallistiOS